Enea Gaqollari (born 14 December 1992) is an Albanian professional footballer who plays as a midfielder for Greek Football League club Aspropyrgos.

References

External links
 

1992 births
Living people
Footballers from Elbasan
Albanian footballers
Albanian emigrants to Greece
Association football midfielders
Xanthi F.C. players
Trikala F.C. players
Platanias F.C. players
Albanian expatriate footballers
Expatriate footballers in Greece
Albanian expatriate sportspeople in Greece